Elemental is the first album by electronic band Cobalt 60, a side-project of Front 242's Jean-Luc De Meyer.

Track listing
 "Bye Bye"          – 3:58
 "Sad"              – 2:11
 "T.O.M.A.M."       – 3:51
 "Before"           – 3:41
 "You Are"          – 4:19
 "The Worried Well" – 5:11
 "If I Was"         – 3:34
 "La Mort"          – 4:50
 "In the Valley"    – 4:37
 "Born Again"       – 4:49
 "Little Planet"    - 3:42
 "Poor Poor Pam"    - 3:04

Personnel
 Jean-Luc De Meyer - vocals
 Dominique Lallement - machines
 Cassell Webb - backing vocals on "Little Planet"

References

1998 albums